Raveningham (pronounced "Ran-ing'm") is a small village and parish in the county of Norfolk, England, about  south-east of Norwich.

Raveningham is mentioned in the Domesday Book as one of the settlements in Clavering hundred.

Raveningham Hall is the home of Sir Nicholas and Lady Bacon: Raveningham Hall Gardens are open to the public once a year as part of the National Gardens Scheme. Located within the premises is St Andrews church, one of 124 existing round-tower churches in Norfolk.

St Andrew's Church
The east window has glass by Kempe depicting the crucifixion flanked by St Peter and St Andrew.

Notes

External links

St Andrew's on the European Round Tower Churches website

Villages in Norfolk
Civil parishes in Norfolk